Tower of Magicks is an adventure for fantasy role-playing games published by Mayfair Games in 1983.

Contents
Tower of Magicks is a scenario for good-aligned characters of levels 3-6, and a sequel to Beastmaker Mountain.  This is an adventure where problems are best solved by thought rather than combat.  The book includes dungeon floor plans.  The adventure is also suitable for use with Dungeons & Dragons and Tunnels & Trolls.

Publication history
Tower of Magicks was written by Bill Fawcett, with a cover by Janny Wurts, and was published by Mayfair Games in 1983 as a 40-page book.

Reception

Reviews

References

Fantasy role-playing game adventures
Role Aids
Role-playing game supplements introduced in 1983